Aknīste Municipality is a former municipality in Selonia, Latvia. The municipality was formed in 2009 by merging Aknīste town with its countryside territory, Asare parish and Gārsene parish, the administrative centre being Aknīste. In 2010 Aknīste parish was created from the countryside territory of Aknīste town. The population in 2020 was 2,520.

On 1 July 2021, Aknīste Municipality ceased to exist and its territory was merged into Jēkabpils Municipality.

See also 
 Administrative divisions of Latvia

References

External links 
 

 
Former municipalities of Latvia